St James Park and variants may refer to:

Municipalities
 St James Park, New Zealand, a suburb of Hamilton, New Zealand

Football stadiums
 St James' Park, Newcastle upon Tyne, England
 St James Park (Exeter), Exeter, England
 St James Park, ground of Brackley Town F.C., Brackley, England.
 St. James' Park, ground of St. James' GAA, Ardfield, Ireland

Parks
 St James's Park, London, England
 St James' Park, Bristol, England
 St. James Park, Toronto, Canada
 St James' Park, Southampton, England
 St. James Park (Bronx), Bronx, New York
 St. James Park (San Jose), San Jose, California

Historic districts
 St. James Park Historic District, Los Angeles

Transport
 St James Park railway station, a station in Exeter, England
 St James's Park tube station, a station in London, England

See also
 St. James Square (disambiguation)
 St. James (disambiguation)